The Standing Saint is a circa 1528–1530 painting by Hans Baldung. It is on display in the Musée de l'Œuvre Notre-Dame, with its pendant, Saint George. Its inventory number is MBA 2130.a ("MBA" stands for Musée des Beaux-Arts).

The identity of the depicted Christian Saint is uncertain. Because of his lance, he is sometimes referred to as "Saint Matthias" or, less often, as "Saint Thomas". His energetic head strongly resembles the man's from Das ungleiche Liebespaar ("The unequal Lovers"), a 1528 painting now in the Staatliche Kunsthalle Karlsruhe. 

The Standing Saint′s pendant in the Strasbourg museum is a Saint George (MBA 2130.b), which is considered a weaker work from the anatomical standpoint and probably in part the work of an assistant. Both paintings were probably the wings of a dismembered and unidentified altarpiece. The Standing Saint is representative for Baldung's blend of International Gothic and Italian Renaissance and an early example of his own brand of Mannerism.

References

1520s paintings
Paintings in the Musée de l'Œuvre Notre-Dame
Paintings by Hans Baldung
Paintings in the collection of the Musée des Beaux-Arts de Strasbourg
Oil paintings